Battery is a 2022 Indian Tamil-language crime thriller directed by Mani Bharathi and starring Senguttuvan, Ammu Abhirami and Deepak Shetty. Based on the subject of medical corruption, it was released across Tamil Nadu on 29 July 2022.

Cast 
 Senguttuvan as Sub Inspector of Police Pugazh 
 Ammu Abhirami as Asha
 Deepak Shetty as Assistant Commissioner of Police Victor
 Yog Japee as Inspector Rathnam
Nagendra Prasad as Arjun
 M. S. Bhaskar as Pugazh’s Grandfather 
Rajkumar as Constable Saravanan
George Maryan as Constable
Abhishek Vinod as David Santhosh

Production 
The film began production in 2019, with filmmaker Mani Bharathi - a former journalist. Senguttuvan, who also produced the film, was cast in the lead role, alongside Ammu Abhirami. A song for the film was shot in Kullu Manali.

Actor Soori attended the audio release of the film after Mani Bharathi's friend, director N. Linguswamy, requested that the actor appear at the event as the chief guest.

Reception 
The film was released on 29 July 2022. A critic from Dina Malar concluded that the film was "low on charge", criticising the script. A reviewer from Dina Thanthi gave the film a middling review.

References 

2022 thriller films
2020s Tamil-language films